Scutigera asiatica is a species of centipede in the family Scutigeridae.

References 

 Seliwanoff A. (1884) Materialii k isyceniu russkich tuisiacenogech (Myriapoda), Horae Societatis Entomologicae Rossicae.  18: 69-121
 Attems C. (1904) Central- und hoch-asiatische Myriopoden. Gesammelt im Jahre 1900 von Dr. von Almassy und Dr. von Stummer, Zoologische Jahrbücher, Abteilung für Systematik. 20: 113-130
 Bisby F.A., Roskov Y.R., Orrell T.M., Nicolson D., Paglinawan L.E., Bailly N., Kirk P.M., Bourgoin T., Baillargeon G., Ouvrard D. (red.) (2011). ”Species 2000 & ITIS Catalogue of Life: 2011 Annual Checklist.”. Species 2000: Reading, UK. Läst 24 September 2012.
 ChiloBase: A World Catalogue of Centipedes (Chilopoda) for the web. Minelli A. (ed), 2006-10-10

External links 
 

Animals described in 1894
Scutigeromorpha